N. Samsudheen is currently a member of 15th Kerala Legislative Assembly. He represents Mannarkkad (State Assembly constituency). He was member of 13th   and 14th Kerala Legislative Assembly  and represented Mannarkkad (State Assembly constituency) both times. He belongs to Indian Union Muslim League.

Biography
N. Samsudheen was born in Paravanna, Tirur, Kerala, India on 31 May 1969 to Mohammed Kutty and Mariyakutty. He attended the Govt. High School Paravanna and holds B.Com. degree from Thunchan Memorial Government College, M.Com. degree from Pocker Sahib Memorial Orphanage College and LL.B. degree from Government Law College, Kozhikode. He was successively elected to the Kerala Legislative Assembly from Mannarkkad (State Assembly constituency) in 2011, 2016 and 2021 elections.

References

Members of the Kerala Legislative Assembly
Indian Union Muslim League politicians
1969 births
Living people